Vodranty is a municipality and village in Kutná Hora District in the Central Bohemian Region of the Czech Republic. It has about 90 inhabitants.

History
The first written mention of Vodranty is from 1738.

References

Villages in Kutná Hora District